Wolfgang Reinhardt (13 December 1908 – 28 July 1979) was a German film producer and screenwriter. He was best known for co-writing the screenplay for the film Freud: The Secret Passion (1962), which earned him Academy Award and Writers Guild of America Award nominations.

Filmography
 Juarez (1939 - writer)
 Dr. Ehrlich's Magic Bullet (1940)
 My Love Came Back (1940)
 The Male Animal (1942)
 Three Strangers (1946)
 Caught (1949)
 Stazione Termini (1953)
 Ludwig II (1955)
 Die Trapp-Familie (1956)
 Freud (1962)
 Hitler: The Last Ten Days (1973)

References

External links
 

1908 births
1979 deaths
Film people from Berlin
German emigrants to the United States